Tracy Ashton is an American film and television actress. She earned a degree from Southern Illinois University in dance. In all her roles Tracy Ashton appears as disabled girls and women, because her left leg is amputated above the knee. One of her best known roles was a recurring role as Didi in the television series My Name Is Earl.

Personal life
Tracy Ashton is the mother of a son named Noah. She suffered from Myxoid liposarcoma, and her left leg was amputated in 1995.

Filmography

References

External links
 
 

American actresses
American amputees
Living people
Southern Illinois University alumni
Year of birth missing (living people)
21st-century American women